Rzewnie  is a village in Maków County, Masovian Voivodeship, in east-central Poland. It is the seat of the gmina (administrative district) called Gmina Rzewnie.

References

Rzewnie